The Ferrari F2001 was a highly successful Formula One car that the Ferrari team competed with for the 2001 Formula One season. The chassis was designed by Rory Byrne, Ignazio Lunetta, Aldo Costa, Marco Fainello, Nikolas Tombazis and James Allison with Ross Brawn playing a vital role in leading the production of the car as the team's Technical Director and Paolo Martinelli assisted by Giles Simon leading the engine design and operations. A revised version known as the F2001B was used in the first two races of  before being replaced by the F2002.

Ferrari used 'Marlboro' logos, except at the French, British and United States Grands Prix.

Overview 

The F2001 was designed around new regulation changes which mandated a higher-mounted front wing assembly to reduce downforce. This resulted in a distinctive 'droopsnoot' nose section and spoon-shaped front wing. The season also saw the re-introduction of traction and launch control systems, therefore the car and its suspension were designed with this in mind.

Being somewhat of a departure over previous Brawn/Byrne Ferrari designs, the car was based more on McLaren's design thinking. A test with the 2000 car-which featured a high nose-that was adapted to the new regulations made that design impractical, so a low nose was adopted instead. The F2001 used the same basic gearbox and internal layout as its predecessors, however the aerodynamic efficiency and tyre wear were improved considerably over the F300 (1998), F399 and F1-2000.

Setting up the car proved easier, and it was faster than the rival McLaren MP4-16, but the Williams FW23—although aerodynamically inferior—was fitted with the massively powerful BMW engine, which was more than a match for the Ferrari power unit. The Ferrari was notably more reliable than either of its rivals however.

Season performance
The season would turn out to be easy for Michael Schumacher, who took nine victories and his fourth world championship—scoring a then-record 123 points. He also surpassed Alain Prost's record for most Grand Prix wins during the year.  He failed to finish only twice, but his teammate Rubens Barrichello had the lion's share of bad luck and looked poised to take wins himself, being hindered only by unreliability. All the while, Ferrari won its third straight Constructors' Championship.

The car was updated before the season finale in Japan, ostensibly to test 2002 components in race conditions. The updated F2001 was still competitive at the beginning of the 2002 season and Schumacher took the car's final win at the Australian Grand Prix before it was replaced by the all-conquering F2002 from the third race (only for Schumacher) and fourth race onwards (for Barrichello). Overall, the F2001 took ten wins, thirteen pole positions, three fastest laps and 197 points throughout its lifespan.

Ferrari used 'Marlboro' logos, except at the French, British, Italian and United States Grands Prix.

Complete Formula One results
(key) (results in bold indicate pole position; results in italics indicate fastest lap)

* 14 points scored with the F2001

References

External links

F2001
2001 Formula One season cars
2002 Formula One season cars
Formula One championship-winning cars